Daniel Schaeffer Kemp (October 20, 1936May 2, 2020) was an American organic chemist, an emeritus professor of chemistry at the Massachusetts Institute of Technology. Kemp's work was focused on the synthesis and conformational analysis of peptides. He developed several chemical ligation strategies and methods for templating the formation of helices and sheets. The eponymous  and the  reaction (and the  variant) are among his developments. He was the author of an organic chemistry textbook. He died from COVID-19 during the COVID-19 pandemic in Massachusetts.

Background
Kemp was born in Portland, Oregon. He received his Bachelor of Arts in chemistry from Reed College in 1958 and his Ph.D. from Harvard University in 1964, where he studied under R. B. Woodward. He was elected to the Harvard Society of Fellows.

Awards and honors
 1997 — Arthur C. Cope Scholar Award of the American Chemical Society
 2000 — Ralph F. Hirschmann Award in Peptide Chemistry of the American Chemical Society

Books

See also
 MIT Chemistry Department

References

External links
 Profile of Prof. Kemp on the MIT Chemistry Department website

1936 births
2020 deaths
Scientists from Portland, Oregon
Reed College alumni
Harvard University alumni
Massachusetts Institute of Technology School of Science faculty
Deaths from the COVID-19 pandemic in Massachusetts